The 1920–21 season was the 12th in the history of the Isthmian League, an English football competition.

Ilford were champions, winning their second Isthmian League title.

League table

References

Isthmian League seasons
I